The following is a partial list of products manufactured under the Pentax brand.

Film cameras

35 mm SLR cameras

M37 screw mount

Cameras using the M37 lens mount.

 Ashiflex I (1952–1953)
 Asahiflex Ia (1953–1954) — also sold as the Tower 23
 Asahiflex IIb (1954–1957) — also sold as the Tower 23
 Asahiflex IIa (1955–1957) — also sold as the Tower 22 and Tower 24

M42 screw mount

Cameras using the M42 lens mount, also known as the Pentax screw mount.

 Asahi Pentax (1957) — also sold as the Tower 26
 Asahi Pentax S (1958) — also sold as the Tower 26
 Asahi Pentax K (1958) — also sold as the Tower 29
 Asahi Pentax S2/H2 (1959) — also sold as the Honeywell Pentax H2/Honeywell Heiland Pentax H2
 Asahi Pentax S3/H3 (1960) — also sold as the Honeywell Pentax H3/Honeywell Heiland Pentax H3
 Asahi Pentax S1/H1 (1961) — also sold as the Honeywell Pentax H1/Honeywell Heiland Pentax H1
 Asahi Pentax SV/H3v (1963) — also sold as the Honeywell Pentax H3v
 Asahi Pentax S1a/H1a (1963) — also sold as the Honeywell Pentax H1a/Honeywell Heiland Pentax H1a
 Pentax Spotmatic (1964) — also sold as Honeywell Pentax Spotmatic
 Asahi Pentax Spotmatic SL (1968) — also sold as the Honeywell Pentax Spotmatic SL]
 Asahi Pentax Spotmatic SP500 (1971) — also sold as the Honeywell Pentax Spotmatic SP500
 Asahi Pentax Spotmatic II (1971)
 Honeywell Pentax Spotmatic IIa (1971) — USA only
 Asahi Pentax Spotmatic Electro-Spotmatic (1971) — limited release Japan only
 Asahi Pentax Spotmatic ES (1971) — also sold as the Honeywell Pentax Spotmatic ES
 Asahi Pentax Spotmatic SP1000 (1973) — also sold as the Honeywell Pentax Spotmatic SP1000
 Asahi Pentax Spotmatic F (1973) — also sold as Honeywell Pentax Spotmatic F
 Asahi Pentax Spotmatic ES 2 (1973) — also sold as the Honeywell Pentax Spotmatic ES 2

Pentax K mount
Cameras using the Pentax K lens mount.

K series

 Pentax K2 (1975–1980)
 Pentax KX (1975–1977)
 Pentax KM (1975–1977)
 Pentax K1000/1 (1975–1978)
 Pentax K2DMD (1976–1980)

M series

 Pentax ME (1976–1980)
 Pentax MX (1976–1985)
 Pentax K1000/2 (1978–1995)
 Pentax MV (1979–1981)
 Pentax MV 1 (1979–1981)
 Pentax ME Super (1980–1987)
 Pentax ME F (1981–1988)
 Pentax MG (1982–1985)

L series
 Pentax LX (1980–2001)

A series

 Pentax A3 (1985–1987)
 Pentax A3000 (1985–1987)
 Pentax Program A/Program Plus (1984–1988)
 Pentax Super A/Super Program (1983–1987)

P series

 Pentax P3 (1985–1988) — Program and manual; flash bulb; tripod ready; shutter speeds of 1-1000
 Pentax P30 (1985–1988)
 Pentax P5 (1986–1989)
 Pentax P50 (1986–1989)
 Pentax P3n (1988–1990)
 Pentax P30n (1988–1990)
 Pentax P30T (1990–1997)

SF series
 Pentax SFX/SF1 (1987–1989)
 Pentax SF7/SF10 (1988–1993)
 Pentax SFXn/SF1n (1989–1993)

Z/PZ series

 Pentax PZ-1/Z-1 (1991)
 Pentax PZ-10/Z-10 (1991)
 Pentax PZ-20/Z-20 (1992)
 Pentax Z-50p (1993)
 Pentax Z-5 (1994)
 Pentax Z-5p (1995)
 Pentax PZ-1p/Z-1p (1995)
 Pentax PZ-70/Z-70 (1995)

MZ/ZX series

 Pentax MZ-5/ZX-5 (1996)
 Pentax MZ-10/ZX-10 (1996)
 Pentax MZ-3 (1997)
 Pentax MZ-5n/ZX-5n (1997)
 Pentax MZ-50/ZX-50 (1998)
 Pentax MZ-M/ZX-M (1998)
 Pentax MZ-7/ZX-7 (1999)
 Pentax MZ-30/ZX-30 (2000)
 Pentax MZ-S (2001-2006)
 Pentax MZ-6/ZX-L (2001)
 Pentax MZ-60/ZX-60 (2002)

*ist series
 Pentax *ist (2003–2006)

35 mm compact cameras

Pentax Espio

These cameras are known as IQ-Zoom in the North American market. Model numbers and specifications are the same in several cases. The Espio was introduced in 1992.

 Espio 24EW
 Espio 60S/60V
 Espio 70/70E
 Espio 80/80E
 Espio 90MC
 Espio 95S
 Espio 105G/105Mi/105S/105SW/105WR
 Espio 110
 Espio 115/115G/115M
 Espio 120SW/120SW II
 Espio 130M
 Espio 135M
 Espio 140/140M/140V
 Espio 145M Super
 Espio 150SL
 Espio 160
 Espio 170SL
 Espio 200
 Espio 628
 Espio 738/738G/738S
 Espio 838/838G/838S
 Espio 928/928M
 Espio Junior
 Espio Mini
 Espio P
 Espio W

Pentax IQ-Zoom

North American market models

 IQ-Zoom 28W
 IQ-Zoom 60/60R/60S
 IQ-Zoom 70/70XL
 IQ-Zoom 80E/80G/80S
 IQ-Zoom 90MC/90WR
 IQ-Zoom 95S/95WR
 IQ-Zoom 105 Super/105R/105S/105SW/105WR
 IQ-Zoom 110
 IQ-Zoom 115/115G/115M/115S
 IQ-Zoom 120/120Mi/120SW
 IQ-Zoom 130M
 IQ-Zoom 135M
 IQ-Zoom 140/140M/140M Super
 IQ-Zoom 150SL
 IQ-Zoom 160
 IQ-Zoom 170SL
 IQ-Zoom 200
 IQ-Zoom 700
 IQ-Zoom 735
 IQ-Zoom 835
 IQ-Zoom 900
 IQ-Zoom 928/928M
 IQ-Zoom EZY/EZY-80/EZY-R/EZY-S

Pentax PC

 PC 30
 PC 33
 PC 35AF/35AFM/35R
 PC 50
 PC 55
 PC 100
 PC 300
 PC 303
 PC 313
 PC 330
 PC 333
 PC 500
 PC 505
 PC 550
 PC 555
 PC 606 W
 PC 700
 PC 3000 (2001)
 PC 5000 (2001)

Pentax Zoom
 Zoom 105R/105 Super
 Zoom 280P
 Zoom 60/60X
 Zoom 70/70R/70S/70X
 Zoom 90/90R/90WR

Other point-and-shoot cameras
 Mini Sport 35 I/II/AF/M
 Pino 35/35M
 Sport 35 Motor/Sport 35 Motor Date
 Sport/Sport Date
 UC-1

APS cameras
 Pentax efina (1997)
 Pentax efina AF50 (1999)
 Pentax efina J (2000)
 Pentax efina T (1999)

110 film SLR cameras

 Pentax Auto 110 (1979)
 Pentax Auto 110 Super (1982)

Medium-format cameras
 Pentax 6x7 (1969)
 Pentax 67 (1990)
 Pentax 67II (1999)
 Pentax 645 (1984)
 Pentax 645N (1997)
 Pentax 645NII (2001)

Digital cameras

Digital SLR cameras

Early Pentax DSLRs

 EI-2000 (2000) — identical to the HP PhotoSmart C912
 EI-3000 (2001) — prototype only

K-mount DSLRs
As of March 2018, 32 different models have been released. All K-series bodies (except the full-frame K-1) have APS-C 1.5x crop sensors and Pentax K lens mounts.

MZ series
 Pentax MZ-D (2000) — prototype, did not reach production

*ist series

 Pentax *ist D (2003)
 Pentax *ist DS (2004)
 Pentax *ist DL (2005)
 Pentax *ist DS2 (2004)
 Pentax *ist DL2 (2005)

K series 

 Pentax K100D (2006)
 Pentax K110D (2006)
 Pentax K10D (2006)
 Pentax K100D Super (2007)
 Pentax K200D (2008)
 Pentax K20D (2008)
 Pentax K-m (K2000) (2008)
 Pentax K-7 (2009)
 Pentax K-x (2010)
 Pentax K-r (2010)
 Pentax K-5 (2010)
 Pentax K-30 (2012)
 Pentax K-5 II (2012) — replacement for the enthusiast-level K-5
 Pentax K-5 IIs (2012) — similar to the K-5 II, except that the sensor lacks an anti-aliasing filter
 Pentax K-3 (2013) — high-end APS-C model above the K-5 series
 Pentax K-50 (2013) — replacement for the mid-range K-30
 Pentax K-500 (2013) — entry level
 Pentax K-S1 (2014) — mid-level compact APS-C DSLR
 Pentax K-S2 (2015) — mid-level compact APS-C DSLR
 Pentax K-3 II (2015) — high-end APS-C model, enhanced K-3 (GPS, Astrotracer and Pixel Shift Resolution)
 Pentax K-1 (2016) — brand's first full-frame model
 Pentax K-70 (2016) — replacement for the mid-range K-50
 Pentax KP (2017) — higher-end APS-C model
 Pentax K-1 II (2018) — replacement for the K-1
 Pentax K-3 III (2021) — high-end APS-C model, enhanced K-3 (AF, ISO and optical viewfinder)
 Pentax KF (2022) — replacement for the mid-range K-70

Medium-format DSLRs 

 Pentax 645D (2010)
 Pentax 645D IR (2013) - IR-modified, only in Japan
 Pentax 645Z (2014)
 Pentax 645Z IR (2016) - IR-modified, only in Japan

Mirrorless interchangeable lens cameras
 Pentax Q (2011)
 Pentax Q10 (2012)
 Pentax Q7 (2013), similar to Pentax Q10, but has larger sensor (1/1.7")
 Pentax Q-S1 (2014), updated Q7
 Pentax K-01 (2012)

Digital compact cameras

Early Pentax compact digital cameras

 EI-C90 (1996) — detachable EI-L90 LCD screen
 EI-200 (2000) — Identical to the HP PhotoSmart C618
 EI-100 (2001)
 DB-100 (2002) — digital camera binoculars (note: single not stereo images)

Pentax Optio series

Bridge cameras
X70
X90 (2010)
X-5 (2012)
XG-1 (2014)

Lenses

K-mount lenses

K-mount lenses such as the original K and 
the M, A, F, FA, DA and DA* series.

Digital era prime lenses
 SMC Pentax-DA 14mm F2.8 ED [IF]
 HD Pentax-DA 15mm F4 ED AL Limited
 SMC Pentax-DA 15mm F4 ED AL Limited
 HD Pentax-DA 21mm F3.2 Limited
 SMC Pentax-DA 21mm F3.2 Limited
 SMC Pentax-DA 35mm F2.4 AL
 HD Pentax-DA 35mm F2.8 Limited Macro  
 SMC Pentax-DA 35mm F2.8 Limited Macro
 HD Pentax-DA 40mm F2.8 Limited 
 SMC Pentax-DA 40mm F2.8 Limited
 SMC Pentax-DA 50mm F1.8 
 SMC Pentax-DA* 55mm F1.4 SDM
 HD Pentax-DA 70mm F2.4 Limited
 SMC Pentax-DA 70mm F2.4 Limited
 SMC Pentax-DA* 200mm F2.8 ED [IF] SDM
 SMC Pentax-DA* 300mm F4 ED [IF] SDM
 HD Pentax-DA 560mm F5.6 ED AW

Digital era zoom lenses
 HD Pentax-DA 10-17mm F3.5-4.5 Fish-Eye ED
 HD Pentax-DA 16-85mm F3.5-5.6 ED DC WR
 HD Pentax-DA 18-50mm F4-5.6 DC WR RE
 HD Pentax-DA 20-40mm F2.8-4 Limited DC WR
 HD Pentax-DA 55-300mm F4.5-6.3 ED PLM WR RE
 HD Pentax-DA 55-300mm F4-5.8 ED WR
 HD Pentax-DA* 11-18mm F2.8 ED DC AW
 SMC Pentax-DA 10-17mm F3.5-4.5 Fish-Eye ED [IF]
 SMC Pentax-DA 12-24mm F4 ED AL [IF]
 SMC Pentax-DA 16-45mm F4
 SMC Pentax-DA 17-70mm F4 AL [IF] SDM
 SMC Pentax-DA 18-135mm F3.5-5.6 ED AL [IF] DC WR
 SMC Pentax-DA 18-250mm F3.5-6.3 ED AL [IF]
 SMC Pentax-DA 18-270mm F3.5-6.3 ED SDM
 SMC Pentax-DA 18-55mm F3.5-5.6 AL
 SMC Pentax-DA 18-55mm F3.5-5.6 AL II
 SMC Pentax-DA 18-55mm F3.5-5.6 AL WR
 SMC Pentax-DA 50-200mm F4-5.6 ED
 SMC Pentax-DA 50-200mm F4-5.6 ED WR
 SMC Pentax-DA 55-300mm F4-5.8 ED
 SMC Pentax-DA* 16-50mm F2.8 ED AL [IF] SDM
 SMC Pentax-DA* 50-135mm F2.8 ED [IF] SDM
 SMC Pentax-DA* 60-250mm F4 ED [IF] SDM

Digital era kit zoom lenses
 SMC Pentax-DA L 18-50mm F4-5.6 DC WR RE
 SMC Pentax-DA L 18-55mm F3.5-5.6 AL
 SMC Pentax-DA L 18-55mm F3.5-5.6 AL WR
 SMC Pentax-DA L 50-200mm F4-5.6 ED
 SMC Pentax-DA L 50-200mm F4-5.6 ED WR
 SMC Pentax-DA L 55-300mm F4-5.8 ED

Full frame (35mm) film and digital era prime lenses
 HD Pentax-D FA 21mm F2.4 ED Limited DC WR
 HD Pentax-D FA* 50mm F1.4 SDM AW
 SMC Pentax-D FA 50mm F2.8 Macro
 HD Pentax-D FA* 85mm F1.4 SDM AW
 SMC Pentax-D FA 100mm F2.8 Macro
 SMC Pentax-D FA 100mm F2.8 Macro WR

Full frame (35mm) film and digital era zoom lenses
 HD Pentax-D FA 150-450mm F4.5-5.6 ED DC AW
 HD Pentax-D FA 15-30mm F2.8 ED SDM WR
 HD Pentax-D FA 24-70mm F2.8 ED SDM WR
 HD Pentax-D FA 28-105mm F3.5-5.6 ED DC WR
 HD Pentax-D FA 70-210mm F4 ED SDM WR
 HD Pentax-D FA* 70-200mm F2.8 ED DC AW

Compact lenses designed for K-01 camera
 SMC Pentax-DA 40mm F2.8 XS

Film era auto focus prime lenses
Compatible with all Pentax DSLRs
 SMC Pentax-FA 20mm F2.8
 SMC Pentax-FA* 24mm F2 AL [IF]
 SMC Pentax-FA 28mm F2.8 AL
 SMC Pentax-FA 28mm F2.8 Soft
 SMC Pentax-FA 31mm F1.8 AL Limited
 SMC Pentax-FA 35mm F2 AL
 HD Pentax-FA 35mm F2
 SMC Pentax-FA 43mm F1.9 Limited
 SMC Pentax-FA 50mm F1.4
 SMC Pentax-FA 50mm F1.7
 SMC Pentax-FA 50mm F2.8 Macro
 SMC Pentax-FA 77mm F1.8 Limited
 SMC Pentax-FA 85mm F2.8 Soft
 SMC Pentax-FA* 85mm F1.4 [IF]
 SMC Pentax-FA 100mm F2.8 Macro
 SMC Pentax-FA 100mm F3.5 Macro
 SMC Pentax-FA 135mm F2.8 [IF]
 SMC Pentax-FA* 200mm F2.8 ED [IF]
 SMC Pentax-FA* 200mm F4 Macro ED [IF]
 SMC Pentax-FA* 300mm F2.8 ED [IF]
 SMC Pentax-FA* 300mm F4.5 ED [IF]
 SMC Pentax-FA* 400mm F5.6 ED [IF]
 SMC Pentax-FA* 600mm F4 ED [IF]

Film era auto focus zoom lenses
Compatible with all Pentax DSLRs
 SMC Pentax-FA 100-300mm F4.5-5.6
 SMC Pentax-FA 100-300mm F4.7-5.8
 SMC Pentax-FA 20-35mm F4 AL
 SMC Pentax-FA 24-90mm F3.5-4.5 AL [IF]
 SMC Pentax-FA 28-105mm F3.2-4.5 AL [IF]
 SMC Pentax-FA 28-105mm F4-5.6 [IF]
 SMC Pentax-FA 28-200mm F3.8-5.6 AL [IF]
 SMC Pentax-FA 28-70mm F4 AL
 SMC Pentax-FA 28-80mm F3.5-4.7
 SMC Pentax-FA 28-80mm F3.5-5.6
 SMC Pentax-FA 28-80mm F3.5-5.6 AL
 SMC Pentax-FA 28-90mm F3.5-5.6
 SMC Pentax-FA 35-80mm F4-5.6
 SMC Pentax-FA 70-200mm F4-5.6
 SMC Pentax-FA 80-200mm F4.7-5.6
 SMC Pentax-FA 80-320mm F4.5-5.6
 SMC Pentax-FA* 250-600mm F5.6 ED [IF]
 SMC Pentax-FA* 28-70mm F2.8 AL
 SMC Pentax-FA* 80-200mm F2.8 ED [IF]
 SMC-Pentax FA 28-105mm F4-5.6

Film era auto focus budget zoom lenses
Compatible with all Pentax DSLRs
 SMC Pentax-FA J 18-35mm F4-5.6
 SMC Pentax-FA J 28-80mm F3.5-5.6 AL
 SMC Pentax-FA J 75-300mm F4.5-5.8 AL

Film era auto focus prime lenses
Compatible with all Pentax DSLRs
 SMC Pentax-F 28mm F2.8
 SMC Pentax-F 50mm F1.4
 SMC Pentax-F 50mm F1.7
 SMC Pentax-F 50mm F2.8 Macro
 SMC Pentax-F 85mm F2.8 Soft
 SMC Pentax-F 100mm F2.8 Macro
 SMC Pentax-F 135mm F2.8 [IF]
 SMC Pentax-F* 300mm F4.5 ED [IF]
 SMC Pentax-F* 600mm F4 ED [IF]

Film era auto focus zoom lenses
Compatible with all Pentax DSLRs
 SMC Pentax-F 100-300mm F4.5-5.6
 SMC Pentax-F 17-28mm F3.5-4.5 Fish-Eye
 SMC Pentax-F 24-50mm F4
 SMC Pentax-F 28-80mm F3.5-4.5
 SMC Pentax-F 35-105mm F4-5.6
 SMC Pentax-F 35-135mm F3.5-4.5
 SMC Pentax-F 35-70mm F3.5-4.5
 SMC Pentax-F 35-80mm F4-5.6
 SMC Pentax-F 70-210mm F4-5.6
 SMC Pentax-F 80-200mm F4.7-5.6
 SMC Pentax-F* 250-600mm F5.6 ED [IF]

Film era manual focus, auto aperture, prime lenses
Compatible with all Pentax DSLRs

 SMC Pentax-A 15mm F3.5
 SMC Pentax-A 16mm F2.8 Fish-Eye
 SMC Pentax-A 20mm F2.8
 SMC Pentax-A 24mm F2.8
 SMC Pentax-A 28mm F2
 SMC Pentax-A 28mm F2.8
 Takumar-A 28mm F2.8
 SMC Pentax-A 35mm F2
 SMC Pentax-A 35mm F2.8
 SMC Pentax-A 50mm F1.2
 SMC Pentax-A 50mm F1.4
 SMC Pentax-A 50mm F1.7
 SMC Pentax-A 50mm F2
 SMC Pentax-A 50mm F2.8 Macro
 SMC Pentax A* 85mm F1.4
 SMC Pentax-A 100mm F2.8
 SMC Pentax-A 100mm F2.8 Macro
 SMC Pentax-A 100mm F4 Macro
 SMC Pentax-A 135mm F2.8
 SMC Pentax-A* 135mm F1.8
 SMC Pentax A* 200mm F2.8 ED
 SMC Pentax-A 200mm F4
 SMC Pentax-A* 200mm F4 Macro ED
 SMC Pentax-A* 300mm F2.8 ED [IF]
 SMC Pentax-A* 300mm F4
 SMC Pentax-A 400mm F5.6
 SMC Pentax-A* 400mm F2.8 ED [IF]
 SMC Pentax-A* 600mm F5.6 ED [IF]
 SMC Pentax-A* 1200mm F8 ED [IF]

Film era manual focus, auto aperture, zoom lenses
Compatible with all Pentax DSLRs
 SMC Pentax-A 24-50mm F4
 SMC Pentax-A 28-135mm F4
 SMC Pentax-A 28-80mm F3.5-4.5
 SMC Pentax-A 35-105mm F3.5
 SMC Pentax-A 35-135mm F3.5-4.5
 SMC Pentax-A 35-210mm F3.5-4.5
 SMC Pentax-A 35-70mm F3.5-4.5
 SMC Pentax-A 35-70mm F4
 SMC Pentax-A 35-80mm F4-5.6
 SMC Pentax-A 70-210mm F4
 SMC Pentax-A 80-200mm F4.7-5.6

Film era manual prime lenses
Compatible with all Pentax DSLRs
 SMC Pentax-M 20mm F4
 SMC Pentax-M 28mm F2
 SMC Pentax-M 28mm F2.8
 Takumar 28mm F2.8 Bayonet
 SMC Pentax-M 28mm F3.5
 SMC Pentax-M 35mm F1.4
 SMC Pentax-M 35mm F2
 SMC Pentax-M 35mm F2.8
 SMC Pentax-M 40mm F2.8
 SMC Pentax-M 50mm F1.4
 SMC Pentax-M 50mm F1.7
 SMC Pentax-M 50mm F2
 SMC Pentax-M 50mm F4 Macro
 SMC Pentax-M 85mm F2
 SMC Pentax-M 100mm F2.8
 SMC Pentax-M 100mm F4 Macro
 SMC Pentax-M 120mm F2.8
 SMC Pentax-M 135mm F3.5
 Takumar 135mm F2.8 Bayonet
 Takumar 135mm F2.5 Bayonet
 SMC Pentax-M 150mm F3.5
 SMC Pentax-M 200mm F4
 SMC Pentax-M* 300mm F4
 SMC Pentax-M 400mm F5.6
 SMC Pentax-M Reflex 2000mm F13.5

Film era manual zoom lenses
Compatible with all Pentax DSLRs
 SMC Pentax-AF 35-70mm F2.8
 SMC Pentax-M 24-35mm F3.5
 SMC Pentax-M 24-50mm F4
 SMC Pentax-M 28-50mm F3.5-4.5
 SMC Pentax-M 35-70mm F2.8-3.5
 SMC Pentax-M 40-80mm F2.8-4
 SMC Pentax-M 75-150mm F4
 SMC Pentax-M 80-200mm F4.5

Original manual K-mount prime lenses
Compatible with all Pentax DSLRs
 SMC Pentax 15mm F3.5
 SMC Pentax 17mm F4 Fish-Eye
 SMC Pentax 18mm F3.5
 SMC Pentax 20mm F4
 SMC Pentax 24mm F2.8
 SMC Pentax 24mm F3.5
 SMC Pentax 28mm F2
 SMC Pentax 28mm F3.5
 SMC Pentax 28mm F3.5 Shift
 SMC Pentax 30mm F2.8
 SMC Pentax 35mm F2
 SMC Pentax 35mm F3.5
 SMC Pentax 50mm F1.2
 SMC Pentax 50mm F1.4
 SMC Pentax 50mm F4 Macro
 SMC Pentax 55mm F1.8
 SMC Pentax 55mm F2
 SMC Pentax 85mm F1.8
 SMC Pentax 85mm F2.2 Soft
 SMC Pentax 100mm F4 Bellows
 SMC Pentax 100mm F4 Macro
 SMC Pentax 105mm F2.8
 SMC Pentax 120mm F2.8
 SMC Pentax 135mm F2.5
 SMC Pentax 135mm F3.5
 SMC Pentax 150mm F4
 SMC Pentax 200mm F2.5
 SMC Pentax 200mm F4
 SMC Pentax 300mm F4
 SMC Pentax 400mm F5.6
 SMC Pentax 500mm F4.5
 SMC Pentax 1000mm F8
 SMC Pentax Reflex 1000mm F11
 SMC Pentax Reflex 2000mm F13.5

Original manual K-mount zoom lenses
Compatible with all Pentax DSLRs
 SMC Pentax 28-50mm F3.5-4.5
 SMC Pentax 45-125mm F4
 SMC Pentax 80-200mm F4.5
 SMC Pentax 85-210mm F3.5
 SMC Pentax 85-210mm F4.5
 SMC Pentax 135-600mm F6.7
 SMC Pentax 400-600mm Reflex

Pentax K-mount Teleconverters and Adapters
 HD Pentax-DA 1.4x AW AF Rear Converter
 Pentax Adapter K for 645 Lens (645 to K mount)
 Pentax Adapter K for 6x7 Lens (6x7 to K Mount)
 Pentax Mount Adapter K (M42 Screwmount to K Mount)
 Rear Converter K T6-2X
 Rear Converter-A 1.4x-L
 Rear Converter-A 1.4x-S
 Rear Converter-A 2x-L
 Rear Converter-A 2x-S
 SMC Pentax-F 1.7x AF Adapter
 Takumar-A 2x Tele-Converter

M37 screw mount lenses
Lenses for the Asahiflex series cameras.

 Asahi Kogaku Takumar 50 mm f/3.5 (1952)
 Asahi Kogaku Takumar 58 mm f/2.4 (1954)
 Asahi Kogaku Takumar 83 mm f/1.9 (1953)
 Asahi Kogaku Takumar 100 mm f/3.5 (1952)
 Asahi Kogaku Tele-photo 135 mm f/3.5 (1953)
 Asahi Kogaku Tele-photo Takumar 500 mm f/5.0 (1955)

M42 screw mount lenses
Lenses for the Asahi Pentax and Pentax Spotmatic series cameras.

 Takumar 35 mm f/4.0 (1957)
 Takumar 55 mm f/2.2 (1957)
 Takumar 58 mm f/2.0 (1957)
 Takumar 58 mm f/2.4 (1957)
 Takumar 100 mm f/3.5 (1957)
 Takumar 500 mm f/5.0 (1957)
 Takumar 55 mm f/1.8 (1958)
 Takumar 58 mm f/1.8 (1958)
 Auto-Takumar 55 mm f/1.8 (1958)
 Auto-Takumar 55 mm f/1.9 (1958) - Sears model (?)
 Auto-Takumar 55 mm f/2.0 (1958)
 Takumar 83 mm f/1.9 (1958)
 Takumar 105 mm f/2.8 (1958)
 Takumar 135 mm f/3.5 (1958)
 Takumar 300 mm f/4.0 (1958)
 Auto-Takumar 35 mm f/2.3 (1959)
 Auto-Takumar 35 mm f/3.5 (1959)
 Auto-Takumar 105 mm f/2.8 (1959)
 Takumar 200 mm f/3.5 (1959)
 Auto-Takumar 55 mm f/1.8 (1960)
 Auto-Takumar 85 mm f/1.8 (1960)
 Auto-Takumar 135 mm f/3.5 (1960)
 Auto-Takumar 55 mm f/2.2 (1961)
 Takumar 1000 mm f/8.0 (1961)
 Super Takumar 28 mm f/3.5 (1962)
 Super Takumar 35 mm f/3.5 (1962)
 Super Takumar 55 mm f/1.8 (1962)
 Super Takumar 55 mm f/2.0 (1962)
 Super Takumar 85 mm f/1.9 (1962)
 Takumar 105 mm f/2.8 (1962)
 Super Takumar 105 mm f/2.8 (1962)
 Takumar 135 mm f/3.5 (1962)
 Super Takumar 135 mm f/3.5 (1962)
 Takumar 200 mm f/3.5 (1962)
 Tele-Takumar 200 mm f/5.6 (1962)
 Tele-Takumar 300 mm f/6.3 (1962)
 Takumar 1000 mm f/8.0 (1962)
 f/ish-Eye Takumar 18 mm f/11 (1963)
 Super Takumar 55 mm f/1.8 (1963)
 Super Takumar 55 mm f/2.0 (1963)
 Takumar 135 mm f/3.5 (1963)
 Super Takumar 35 mm f/3.5 (1964)
 Super Takumar 50 mm f/1.4 (1964)
 Super Takumar 55 mm f/1.8 (1964)
 Super Takumar 55 mm f/2.0 (1964)
 Takumar 100 mm f/2.0 (1964)
 Super Takumar 105 mm f/2.8 (1964)
 Super Takumar 28 mm f/3.5 (1965)
 Super Takumar 85 mm f/1.9 (1965)
 Tele-Takumar 1000 mm f/8.0 (1965)
 Super Takumar 19 mm f/5.0 (1966)
 Super Takumar 28 mm f/3.5 (1966)
 Super Takumar 35 mm f/3.5 (1966)
 Macro Takumar 50 mm f/4 (1966)
 Super Takumar Zoom 70–150 mm f/4.5 (1966)
 Quartz Takumar 85 mm f/3.5 (1966) - UV bellows lens with a quartz-fluoride element
 Ultra-Achromatic Takumar 85 mm f/4.5 (1966) - UV lens with a quartz-fluoride element
 Bellows-Takumar 100 mm f/4 (1966)
 Super Takumar 135 mm f/3.5 (196)
 Takumar 300 mm f/4.0 (1966)
 Takumar 500 mm f/4.5 (1966)
 Super Takumar 50 mm f/1.4 (1967)

 Super f/ish-Eye-Takumar 17 mm f/4.0 (1968)
 Super Takumar 35 mm f/2.0 (1968)
 Super Takumar 135 mm f/2.5 (1968)
 Super Takumar 150 mm f/4.0 (1968)
 Super Takumar 200 mm f/4.0 (1968)
 Super Takumar 24 mm f/3.5 (1969)
 Super Macro-Takumar 50 mm f/4.0 (1969)
 Super Takumar 300 mm f/4.0 (1969)
 Tele-Takumar 400 mm f/5.6 (1969)
 Super Takumar 20 mm f/4.5 (1971)
 S-M-C Takumar 28 mm f/3.5 (1971)
 S-M-C Takumar 35 mm f/3.5 (1971)
 S-M-C Takumar 50 mm f/1.4 (1971)
 S-M-C Macro-Takumar 50 mm f/4.0 (1971)
 S-M-C Takumar 55 mm f/1.8 (1971)
 S-M-C Takumar 85 mm f/1.9 (1971)
 S-M-C Takumar Zoom 85–210 mm f/4.5 (1971)
 S-M-C Takumar 105 mm f/2.8 (1971)
 S-M-C Takumar 135 mm f/2.5 (1971)
 S-M-C Takumar 135 mm f/3.5 (1971)
 S-M-C Takumar 150 mm f/4.0 (1971)
 S-M-C Takumar 200 mm f/4.0 (1971)
 S-M-C Bellows Takumar 100 mm f/4 (1971)
 S-M-C Takumar 400 mm f/5.6 (1971)
 S-M-C Takumar 500 mm f/4.5 (1971)
 S-M-C Takumar 1000 mm f/8 (1971)
 S-M-C Takumar 35 mm f/2.0 (1972)
 S-M-C Takumar 300 mm f/4.0 (1972)
 SMC Takumar 50 mm f/1.4 (1972)
 SMC Takumar 55 mm f/1.8 (1972)
 S-M-C f/ish-Eye-Takumar 17 mm f/4 (1973)
 S-M-C Takumar 20 mm f/4.5 (1973)
 S-M-C Takumar 24 mm f/3.5 (1973)
 S-M-C Takumar 50 mm f/1.4 (1973)
 S-M-C Takumar 55 mm f/1.8 (1973)
 S-M-C Takumar 55 mm f/2.0 (1973)
 S-M-C Takumar 85 mm f/1.8 (1973)
 Ultra-Achromatic Takumar 85 mm f/4.5 (1973) - UV lens with a quartz-fluoride element
 S-M-C Takumar 120 mm f/2.8 (1973)
 Super Takumar 135 mm f/2.5 (1973)
 Super-Achromatic Takumar 300 mm f/5.6 (1973) - UV lens with a quartz-fluoride element
 SMC Takumar 55 mm f/2.0 (1974)
 SMC Takumar 15 mm f/3.5 (1975)
 SMC Takumar Zoom 45–125 mm f/4.0 (1975)
 S-M-C Macro Takumar 100 mm f/4.0 (1975)
 S-M-C Takumar Zoom 135–600 mm f/6.7 (1975)

Q-mount lenses

Five lenses have been released for the Pentax Q.  A sixth lens and an adapter were announced in September, 2012.

 Pentax 01 Standard Prime (2011) — 47 mm equivalent
 Pentax 02 Standard Zoom (2011) — 28–80 mm equivalent
 Pentax 03 Fisheye (2011) — 17.5 mm equivalent
 Pentax 04 Toy Lens Wide (2011) — 35 mm equivalent
 Pentax 05 Toy Lens Telephoto (2011) — 100 mm equivalent
 Pentax 06 Telephoto Zoom (announced in 2012) — 83–249 mm equivalent
 Pentax Adapter Q for K-Mount Lens (announced in 2012)

Auto 110 lenses

645 lenses

67 lenses

Camera accessories

Flashes

Pentax AF Series

 Takumar AF-14
 Asahi Pentax AF-16
 Pentax AF-080C — ring flash
 Pentax AF-100P - for the Auto 110 series
 Pentax AF-130P - for the Auto 110 series
 Pentax AF-140C — ring flash
 Pentax AF-160FC — ring flash
 Asahi Pentax AF-160A
 Pentax AF-160S
 Pentax AF-200FG
 Pentax AF-200S
 Pentax AF-200Sa
 Pentax AF-200T
 Pentax AF-201SA
 Pentax AF-220T
 Pentax AF-240Z
 Pentax AF-260a
 Pentax AF-280T
 Pentax AF-330FTZ
 Pentax AF-360FGZ
 Pentax AF-400FTZ
 Pentax AF-400T
 Pentax AF-500FTZ
 Pentax AF-540FGZ
 Asahi Pentax Autorobo Auto Electronic Flash

Data transmission 

Pentax offers the Pentax FluCard for adding Wireless data transmission to the DSLR cameras 645Z, K-3 and K-S1.

Other Pentax products

Pentax currently makes a variety of sport optics, including binoculars.

The Pentax line of medical imaging devices was retained by Hoya Corporation when the camera business was sold to Ricoh.

The Pentax line of surveying instruments was sold a Taiwanese company.

External links
 Asahi Optical Historical Club
 Bojidar Dimitrov's Pentax K-Mount Page
 Pentax P-TTL Hot Shoe Flash Options
 Complete list of Asahi (Pentax) cameras with recent live auctions results
 Community Dedicated to Pentax Digital & Film Gear - Current as well as legacy
 TI Ashai Co., Ltd. - surveying instruments

Pentax products
Pentax